Notts, Lincs & Derbyshire 3 was a tier 11 English Rugby Union league with teams from Nottinghamshire, Lincolnshire and Derbyshire taking part.  Promoted teams moved up to Notts, Lincs & Derbyshire 2 and since the cancellation of Notts, Lincs & Derbyshire 4 at the end of the 1995–96 season there was no relegation.   

At the end of the 1999–00 campaign the Notts, Lincs & Derbyshire leagues were merged with the Leicestershire leagues.  This meant that Notts, Lincs & Lincolnshire 3 was cancelled after 13 seasons and all teams transferred into the new Notts, Lincs & Derbyshire/Leicestershire leagues.

Original teams

When league rugby began in 1987 this division contained the following teams:

All Spartans
Ashfield Swans
Bakewell Mannerians
Belper
Bingham
Boots Athletic
Gainsborough
Long Eaton
North Kesteven Old Boys
Rolls Royce
Skegness

Notts, Lincs & Derbyshire 3 honours

Notts, Lincs & Derbyshire 3 (1987–1990)

The original Notts, Lincs & Derbyshire 3 was a tier 9 league.  Promotion was to Notts, Lincs & Derbyshire 2 and relegation was to either Notts, Lincs & Derbyshire 4 East or Notts, Lincs & Derbyshire 4 West.

Notts, Lincs & Derbyshire 3 (1990–1992)

Notts, Lincs & Derbyshire 3 continued as a tier 9 league with promotion to Notts, Lincs & Derbyshire 2.  However, restructuring due to the introduction of Notts, Lincs & Derbyshire 5 meant that relegation was now to a single Notts, Lincs & Derbyshire 4 division.

Notts, Lincs & Derbyshire 3 (1992–1993)

Restructuring of the Midlands leagues saw Notts, Lincs & Derbyshire 3 drop two levels to become a tier 11 league.  Promotion continued to Notts, Lincs & Derbyshire 2 and relegation to Notts, Lincs & Derbyshire 4.

Notts, Lincs & Derbyshire 3 (1993–1996)

The top six teams from Midlands 1 and the top six from North 1 were combined to create National 5 North, meaning that Notts, Lincs & Derbyshire 3 dropped another level to become a tier 12 league.  Promotion continued to Notts, Lincs & Derbyshire 2 and relegation to Notts, Lincs & Derbyshire 4.

Notts, Lincs & Derbyshire 3 (1996–2000)

At the end of the 1995–96 season National 5 North was discontinued and Notts, Lincs & Derbyshire 3 returned to being a tier 11 league.  Promotion continued to Notts, Lincs & Derbyshire 2 while the cancellation of Notts, Lincs & Derbyshire 4 meant that there was no relegation. At the end of the 1999–00 season Notts, Lincs & Derbyshire 3 was cancelled due to Midlands league restructuring and teams transferred into the new Notts, Lincs & Derbyshire/Leicestershire leagues.

Number of league titles

All Spartans (1)
Ashbourne (1)
Bakewell Mannerians (1)
Belper (1)
Bingham (1)
Bolsover (1)
Castle Donington (1)
Cleethorpes (1)
Dronfield (1)
Hope Valley (1)
North Kesteven (1)
Stamford College (1)
University of Derby (1)

Notes

See also
Notts, Lincs & Derbyshire 1
Notts, Lincs & Derbyshire 2
Notts, Lincs & Derbyshire 4
Notts, Lincs & Derbyshire 5
Midlands RFU
Notts, Lincs & Derbyshire RFU
English rugby union system
Rugby union in England

References

External links
 NLD RFU website

11
Rugby union in Nottinghamshire
Rugby union in Derbyshire
Rugby union in Lincolnshire
Sports leagues established in 1987
Sports leagues disestablished in 2000